Monticello University was an unaccredited diploma mill incorporated in Hawaii, but based in Kansas, whose operator Leslie Edwin Snell (aka Dax Snell) was found guilty in 2000 of issuing invalid degrees, and which Kansas has accused of being fake. The Circuit Court of the First Circuit in the State of Hawaii ordered the university, amongst other orders, preventing it from claiming it was legally qualified to issue degrees, to declare that it utilises "erroneous or misleading advertising."

Operation Dipscam listed the university as one of the top ten diploma mills in the United States.

Victims affected by the diploma mill include Babar Awan, the Federal Law Minister of Pakistan.

See also
 Thomas Jefferson Education Foundation, a related fraudulent organisation.
 List of unaccredited institutions of higher learning

References

External links
Default judgement against Gretchen Snell Deckker

Fraud in the United States
Unaccredited institutions of higher learning in the United States